became an attorney at law after serving as a member of the Supreme Court of Japan, Superintending Prosecutor of Tokyo High Public Prosecutors Office and so on.

References

External links 
Panel reports on Olympus' loss coverup / Getty Images
 Tatsuo Kainaka / gettyimages

1940 births
Living people
Chuo University alumni
Japanese prosecutors
Supreme Court of Japan justices